Camera Obscura is a 1921 German silent mystery film directed by Max Obal and starring Ernst Reicher, Alexander Granach, and Walter Dysing. It was part of the Stuart Webbs series of detective films.

Cast
 Ernst Reicher as Stuart Webbs
 Alexander Granach as Der große Chef
 Walter Dysing
 Martha Maria Newes

References

Bibliography

External links

1921 films
Films of the Weimar Republic
German silent feature films
Films directed by Max Obal
German black-and-white films
1920s German films